Terminalia pellucida is a species of plant in the Combretaceae family. It is endemic to the Philippines.  It is threatened by habitat loss.

References

Endemic flora of the Philippines
pellucida
Vulnerable plants
Taxonomy articles created by Polbot